Nancy Petry  is a Canadian artist known for innovation within the field of painting, photography, film and performance art. As one of the first Canadian artists to paint in the style of lyrical abstraction, her work was featured at the Commonwealth Institute (London, UK), at the Musée d'art contemporain de Montréal and in a National Gallery of Canada touring exhibition. She was also instrumental in establishing the Association des graveurs du Québec and contributed to the success of the Montreal alternative art cooperative, Véhicule Art. In 2015 the "Nancy Petry Award" was instituted.

Early life
Nancy Petry (1931) was born and raised in Montreal, Quebec. In 1948 she attended McGill University where she studied painting under John Goodwin Lyman and John Fox. After graduating with a Bachelor of Fine Arts in 1952, she traveled for a year throughout Europe before resuming art training in Paris in 1954. She attended the Académie Julian, and studied under Henri Goetz at the Académie de la Grande Chaumière and under Stanley William Hayter at Atelier 17. In 1956 her first solo exhibition was held at Galerie Voyelles (Paris). Later that year Petry's work became less figurative, and she turned to abstract art while living in Ibiza, Spain, from 1958 to 1959.

Career
As one of the first artists in Quebec to adopt lyrical abstraction, Petry's 1959 solo exhibition at Galerie Agnès Lefort (Montreal) drew attention for “simplicity and economy of harmonious line, form and color”. In 1962 the National Gallery of Canada organized a solo exhibition of her work, Paintings and Watercolours which toured Western Canada from September 1962 to May 1963. Although Petry moved to London, England, in 1962, she continued to exhibit in Canada with a solo exhibition of paintings, Recent Works, held at Galerie Agnès Lefort in 1963. In the United Kingdom, she participated in the 1966 Second Commonwealth Biennial of Abstract Art (London) and in the 1967 Canadian Abstract Art Centennial Exhibition (London and Edinburgh). In 1968 she attended the Slade School of Art for post-graduate lithography and studied under Stanley Jones. In 1969, a solo exhibition of her paintings was held at the Commonwealth Institute (London).

By 1970 Petry divided her time between Montreal and London. In Montreal she joined the print-making studio GRAFF and participated in a group exhibition at North Carolina State University. In 1975, Nancy Petry was one of seven artists invited by the Musée d'art contemporain de Montréal, Canada’s premier contemporary art museum, to paint “in situ” at the exhibition Processus '75. Her work Air Currents, composed of 16, 30"x 48" panels, was noted for its “extreme lightness of treatment, form and material”. In 1976 Petry exhibited in the Musée d'art contemporain de Montréal's group show Cent Onze Dessins du Québec. The following year the National Gallery of Canada toured One Hundred and Eleven Drawings of Quebec across Canada.

In the mid-70s, Petry's art evolved to include happenings, art interventions and new media. In 1975, she joined the artist-run Véhicule Art, Montreal's first parallel gallery for alternative art including installation, performance and multi-media art. In 1978, she attended a 16mm film-making course conducted by Jenny Okun at the London Film-Makers' Co-op and began incorporating film into her art. In 1979 she created The Shadow Figure, collaborating with dancers Édouard Lock and Michelle Fèbvre at Vehicule Art, and Les Naiades with dancer Bonnie Farmer at Concordia University (Montreal) in 1994. Her participation in performance art resulted in what critic Jacques-Bernard Roumanes described as "a new pictorial writing based on movement".

Petry also participated in the 2000, 2004 and 2006 London Biennale. In 2008 a retrospective exhibition of her work was held at the Musée des beaux-arts de Mont-Saint-Hilaire, Quebec. Inspired by travel throughout her career, Voyages, a solo exhibition of her early work held at gallery Beaux-arts des Amériques (Montreal) in 2014, traced her transition from figurative to abstract art.

In 2015 the Nancy Petry Award was established. Artist Rachel Crummey was presented with the first award on May 16 at the RCA Annual General Assembly held at the Musée d'art contemporain de Montréal. Petry lives and works in Montreal, Canada, and London, England.

Contribution
In recognition of her contribution to the visual arts, Petry was inducted into the Royal Canadian Academy of Art (RCA) in 2015. As a multidisciplinary artist, Petry influenced painting, print-making and performance art in Canada. In 1970 she co-founded with Robert Savoie and René Derouin, the Association des graveurs du Québec (later Conseil des graveurs du Québec). From 1977 to 1980 as Vice-Chair and Gallery Coordinator at Véhicule Art, Petry brought many national and international artists to Montreal, including: Nan Hoover, Miller and Cameron, and Reindeer Werk. She was also Véhicule Art's delegate to Arte Fiera (Bologna, Italy) in 1977 and 1978, and was instrumental in "establishing the gallery as the main venue of performance art in Canada".

Petry’s work is found in public collections throughout the Commonwealth including: The British Museum (London), National Gallery of Australia, (Canberra), National Library of Canada (Ottawa), Canada Council Art Bank (Ottawa), Musée d'art contemporain de Montréal, Bibliothèque et Archives nationales du Québec (Montreal), and Confederation Centre Art Gallery (Charlottetown). Her work is also in the collections of the National Centre for Contemporary Arts (Kaliningrad, Russia), Galleria de arte do Sesi  (São Paulo, Brasil) and the Museum of New Art (Detroit, USA).

References

External links
 British Museum Nancy Petry Biography
 Beaux-arts des Amériques CV Web.
 Artist website

1931 births
Living people
Canadian women sculptors
20th-century Canadian painters
21st-century Canadian painters
Canadian photographers
Canadian performance artists
Women performance artists
Artists from Montreal
Sculptors from Quebec
20th-century Canadian sculptors
21st-century Canadian sculptors
20th-century Canadian women artists
21st-century Canadian women artists
Members of the Royal Canadian Academy of Arts
Atelier 17 alumni
Alumni of the Slade School of Fine Art
Académie Colarossi alumni
Académie Julian alumni